Victorio Ruiz García (born 30 April 1926) was a Spanish racing cyclist. He rode in the 1951 Tour de France.

References

External links
 

1926 births
Possibly living people
Spanish male cyclists
Cyclists from Madrid